A real estate trend is any consistent pattern or change in the general direction of the real estate industry which, over the course of time, causes a statistically noticeable change. This phenomenon can be a result of the economy, a change in mortgage rates, consumer speculations, or other fundamental and non-fundamental reasons.

Buyer agency growth
At one time, all real estate brokers and agents, or Realtors, practiced "single agency", meaning they represented only the buyer or the seller. In the 1990s, the concept of buyer agency became popular, allowing a buyer to retain an agent who would represent the best interests of the buyer alone. The first national company to provide this service was The Buyer's Agent, Inc. A 2008 study by Consumer Reports indicates that prior to this development, a Realtor was presumed by state law to be working for the seller. The same study shows that buyers using buyer agents obtained a savings of $5000 in the price of the home as compared to prices paid by unrepresented buyers. It remains true that an unrepresented real estate buyer can still call the sellers agent to arrange a showing of the property. In such cases, the buyer should be advised by Agency Disclosure Laws (a state law in every state in the U.S.) that any information obtained, as well as all conversations and negotiations undertaken, will be for the benefit of the seller.

Lower commission rates
Historical rates are presented in a report by the Government Accountability Office, Congress's investigative arm. A 2005 study of real estate commission rates, reported that realtors tended to charge, "about 5 percent to 7 percent of a property's selling price...". More recently, CBS News, "60 Minutes" television news magazine reported in 2007 that competitive pressure resulting from a record number of licensed agents has driven down the average sales commission rates paid by sellers. A new breed of marketplaces that enable agents to compete for sellers further add pressure to the commission rate structure.

In some states, companies such as Redfin still advertise a commission, but provide a rebate to sellers based on the quality of their surveys reflected in post-close surveys. This is also fraught with difficulties.

Another trend is the emergence of alternatives to the commission model, including flat-fee, hourly home selling, and for sale by owner tools.

Marketing trends
The Internet has become a major lead generation method for real estate marketing, eclipsing local newspapers and all other sources as the consumer's most preferred method to learn about homes for sale. "An overwhelming majority (87%) of recent home buyers in the US say they used the internet as an information resource during their home-buying process, and nearly one-third say they first learned about their newly purchased home from an online channel, according to a study by the National Association of Realtors (NAR). The majority of real estate companies use popular internet marketing methods like SEO, advertising, and social media.

Websites like Craigslist (United States), Daft.ie (Republic of Ireland) and Gumtree (UK) became in the 21st century the main sources for both buyers and sellers. Rapid changes in the market environment forced some countries to introduce new laws regulating real property market on the web.

Even with the introduction of the internet, traditional media and methods of generating leads were still an important part of Real Estate trend:

Mobile applications are also changing the way real estate agents conduct business. Apps like Zillow, Trulia, Zumper, and Rentberry are primarily accessed via mobile devices and have become very popular sources for listing properties for sale or rent. These applications function similarly to websites like Craigslist in that they allow agents or private sellers to list a property like they would in a classified ad albeit with a more dynamic display as well as mechanisms for users browsing a listing to contact the seller directly from the app. These platforms allow buyers to view homes in their desired area from anywhere. Mobile applications are particularly prominent with millennial real estate customers.

US government involvement
The United States Department of Justice Antitrust Division announced the launch of a new website in October 2007 to "educate consumers and policymakers about the potential benefits that competition can bring to consumers of real estate brokerage services and the barriers that inhibit that competition." Among other findings, they report that certain new sales models can reduce consumer home sales costs "by thousands of dollars. For example, in states that allow open competition, some buyer's brokers rebate up to two-thirds of their commission to the customer, and some seller's brokers offer limited-service packages that let sellers list their homes on the local Multiple Listing Service (MLS) for as little as a few hundred dollars." The Justice Department updated their information in a new website in 2016.

Renting 
Renting has recently been gaining popularity in the United States. This has become a more popular residential choice for younger generations due to student loan debt and more convenient locations. Some other pros for renting are amenities, flexibility, and credit building opportunities. The demand for rental units is increasing as there become more perks to renting.

See also
 Real estate
 United States housing bubble
 Real Estate Transaction Specification (RETS)
 Reduced-commission MLS Listings
 Pocket listing (or exclusive listing)
 List of real estate topics
Market trend
:Category:Real estate bubbles
Case–Shiller index

References

External links
 U.S. Department of Justice: Competition and Real Estate

Real estate in the United States